Planning Policy Statement 3: Housing was published in November 2006, outlining the strategic housing policy of the government of the United Kingdom, which was "to ensure that everyone has the opportunity of living in a decent home, which they can afford, in a community where they want to live." The policy was developed in response to the Barker Review.

It replaced Planning Policy Guidance 3: Housing,  which had been published in March 2000.

According to the document, the policy is to be achieved through:
 The provision of a wide choice of homes, or varying sizes, values and tenures.
 Widened opportunities for home ownership.
 Improved affordability through an increased housing supply.
 Creation of sustainable, inclusive and mixed communities.

References

See also
Planning Policy Statements
Town and country planning in the United Kingdom
Planning and Compulsory Purchase Act 2004

United Kingdom planning policy